Kamran Khan (born 23 March 1985) is a retired Pakistani footballer, who throughout his career of 13 years played for Khan Research Laboratories.

Khan won five league titles and six National Cup with the club.

He was selected for the 2006 Nepal friendlies and the 2006 AFC Challenge Cup qualifiers where he won his first cap.

Honours

Khan Research Laboratories

Honors
Pakistan Premier League: 2009–10, 2011–12, 2012–13, 2013–14
Pakistan National Football Challenge Cup: 2009, 2010, 2011, 2012, 2015, 2016

References

1985 births
Living people
Pakistani footballers
Pakistan international footballers
Khan Research Laboratories F.C. players
Association football central defenders
South Asian Games gold medalists for Pakistan
South Asian Games medalists in football